Guerlédan is a commune in the department of Côtes-d'Armor, western France. The municipality was established on 1 January 2017 by merger of the former communes of Mûr-de-Bretagne (the seat) and Saint-Guen. This commune chose its name in reference to the Lake Guerlédan which is on its territory.

Population

See also 
Communes of the Côtes-d'Armor department

References 

Communes of Côtes-d'Armor

Communes nouvelles of Côtes-d'Armor
Populated places established in 2017
2017 establishments in France